The Class BB 67000 are diesel locomotives in service with the SNCF ("French National Railway Company") from the 1960s.

History
The first of the big diesels introduced by SNCF in the 1960s to replace steam locomotives and an early example of Paul Arzens' styling. The class was originally designated as mixed traffic locomotives with the bogies geared accordingly. Later they were allocated to freight work only and the gearing adjusted. They were never fitted with train heating boilers but worked with boiler vans on passenger duties. Thirty members of the class were rebuilt to class BB 67200 specifications between 1980 and 1984 to work ballast trains on the LGV network. 67036 became the prototype ETH locomotive and renumbered 67291. This was the prototype for the BB 67300 class and sixteen of the original locomotives were rebuilt to the latter specification.

Technical details
The locomotive is powered by a V16 90 degree 2400 bhp diesel engine. The engine runs at 1500 rpm, displacing .

References

BB 67000
67000
Standard gauge locomotives of France